WERV-FM (95.9 MHz "95.9 The River") is a commercial FM radio station, licensed to Aurora, Illinois, and serving the western suburbs of Chicago.  It is owned by Alpha Media, through licensee Alpha Media Licensee LLC.  WERV-FM has a classic hits radio format that leans toward classic rock.  Its playlist stresses the rock hits of the 1980s, 90s and early 2000s such as Van Halen, U2 and Bon Jovi, but does not play pop and dance artists such as Michael Jackson, Madonna or Whitney Houston, heard on most classic hits stations.  

WERV-FM has an effective radiated power (ERP) of 2,850 watts.  The studios and transmitter are on Plain Avenue in Aurora.

History

Early years
This station was the radio dream of WLS Radio announcer, emcee, and engineer Russ Salter, who put this station (then WKKD-FM); along with WKKD AM 1580 on the air. WKKD 1580 debuted on September 21, 1960 and WKKD-FM on February 12, 1961. The station's call sign stood for Kane, Kendall and DuPage, which were the primary counties in its coverage area. Both stations' studios, transmitters and towers were at 1880 Plain Avenue in Aurora.

The station was part of a simulcast with WKKD AM 1580. Bill Blough hosted a country music program in the station's first years. Chicago weathercaster Tom Skilling began his career at WKKD, c. 1966, while he attended High School in Aurora.

The Golden Sounds
By 1968, the simulcast had ended. WKKD-FM was branded "The Golden Sounds". The station aired a Beautiful music format in the 1970s and into the early 1980s.

Adult contemporary era
In late 1983, AM 1580's call sign was changed back to WKKD, and the two stations became part of a partial simulcast. The station aired an adult contemporary format, branded as "classic hits", playing music from the 1960s, 1970s, and 1980s. Throughout the 1980s, WKKD was originally used on a local access channel in Naperville throughout its AC days on Jones Intercable until the Summer of 1988.

In the late 1980s, the station aired a soft AC format, as "Lite Mix", with the branding changing to "K-Lite" in 1989. The station continued to air this format into the early 1990s.

In 1992, WKKD-FM became the flagship radio station for Kane County Cougars baseball.

Oldies era

In 1993, the station adopted an oldies format, and was branded "Pure Gold 96". WKKD-FM was again part of a simulcast with WKKD AM 1580. In 1998 the station changed its branding to "Kool 95.9," while continuing to air an oldies format.

In 2000, the Salter family sold WKKD AM & FM, as well as WRWC in Rockford, Illinois to RadioWorks for $6.5 million, plus $1.5 million in consulting and non-compete agreements.

The River
In 2001 WKKD-FM & AM were sold to NextMedia Group for $3.4 million. On January 25, 2001 the station became "95.9 The River", airing a classic hits format with the slogan "Rock 'N Roll Favorites for the 'Burbs". The station's call sign was changed to WERV-FM shortly thereafter.

On July 15, 2006, the station debuted an HD-2 station branded "The Rapids!", airing a hard rock gold format.

NextMedia sold WERV-FM and their 32 other radio stations to Digity, LLC at a price of $84,975,200; the transaction was consummated on February 10, 2014.

Effective February 25, 2016, Digity and its 124 radio stations were acquired by Alpha Media for $264 million.

Personalities heard on The River include Scott Mackay, Nick Jakusz, Mitch Michaels, Leslie Harris and Scott Childers.

See also
WKKD (AM)

References

External links 

ERV
Radio stations established in 1961
1961 establishments in Illinois
Classic hits radio stations in the United States
Alpha Media radio stations